Kurt Bretting (6 June 1892 – 30 May 1918) was a German freestyle swimmer who competed in the 1912 Summer Olympics.

He was born in Magdeburg and was killed in action in Merville, Nord, France during World War I.

In 1912 he finished fourth in the 100 metre freestyle event. He was also a member of the German relay team which finished fourth in the 4x200 metre freestyle relay competition.

See also
 List of Olympians killed in World War I
 World record progression 100 metres freestyle

References

1892 births
1918 deaths
German male swimmers
German male freestyle swimmers
Olympic swimmers of Germany
Swimmers at the 1912 Summer Olympics
German military personnel killed in World War I
World record setters in swimming
Sportspeople from Magdeburg
German Army personnel of World War I